A patrol boat (also referred to as a patrol craft, patrol ship, or patrol vessel) is a relatively small naval vessel generally designed for coastal defence, border security, or law enforcement. There are many designs for patrol boats, and they generally range in size. They may be operated by a nation's navy, coast guard, police, or customs, and may be intended for marine ("blue water"), estuarine ("green water"), or river ("brown water") environments.

Per their name, patrol boats are primarily used to patrol a country's exclusive economic zone (EEZ), but they may also be used in other roles, such as anti-smuggling, anti-piracy, fishery patrols, immigration law enforcement, or search and rescue. Depending on the size, organization, and capabilities of a nation's armed forces, the importance of patrol boats may range from minor support vessels that are part of a coast guard, to flagships that make up a majority of a navy's fleet. Their small size and relatively low cost make them one of the most common naval vessels in the world.

Classification

The classification of a patrol boat is often subjective, but they are generally small naval vessels that are used to patrol national waters or a certain jurisdiction. They may be as large as a frigate or a corvette, though the term may also be used for vessels as small as a yacht or rigid inflatable boat. They can include fast attack craft, torpedo boats, and missile boats. They may be broadly classified as inshore patrol vessels (IPVs) or offshore patrol vessels (OPVs). OPVs are usually the smallest ship in a navy's fleet that are large and seaworthy enough to patrol off-shore in the open ocean, while IPVs are typically too small to do so and are instead kept in lakes or rivers, or close to coasts; IPVs specifically used in rivers can also be called "riverine patrol vessels".

Seagoing patrol boats are typically around 30 m (100 ft) in length and usually carry a single medium caliber artillery gun as main armament, and a variety of lighter secondary armament such as machine guns or a close-in weapon system. Depending on their role, vessels in this class may also have more sophisticated sensors and fire control systems that would enable them to carry torpedoes, anti-ship missiles, and surface-to-air missiles.

History

During both World Wars, in order to rapidly build up numbers, all sides created auxiliary patrol boats by arming motorboats and seagoing fishing trawlers with machine guns and obsolete naval weapons. Some modern patrol vessels are still based on fishing and leisure boats.

During the Vietnam War, the U.S. Navy ordered 193 aluminum hulled  Patrol Craft, Fast (PCFs),  also known as Swiftboats, for brown water naval operations. The Patrol Boat, River (PBR, sometimes called "Riverine" and "Pibber") was a fiberglass hulled vessel also designed and used for inland river operations during the Vietnam War, and became an icon of water operations during the war due to its use in the 1979 film Apocalypse Now.

Most modern designs are powered by gas turbine arrangements such as CODAG, and speeds are generally in the  range. The largest OPVs might also have a flight deck and helicopter embarked. In times of crisis or war, these vessels are expected to support the larger vessels in a navy, though some smaller navies are mostly composed of just patrol boats.

Specific nations

Albania

Albanian Naval Force

Algeria

Algerian National Navy
 Kebir-class
 Alusafe 2000
 Ocea FPB98 MKI

Argentina

Argentine Naval Prefecture
 
 Z-28-class patrol vessel
 Shaldag-class patrol boat

Argentine Navy
 Gowind-class vessel
 Murature-class vessel
 Intrépida-class boat
 Zurubí-class patrol boat
 Baradero class patrol boat
 Punta Mogotes class patrol boat

Australia

Royal Australian Navy

  (1967–1985)
  (1979–2007)
  (2005–present)
  – lead ship expected to enter service in 2022

Australian Border Force Marine Unit
  (1999–present)
 Australian Customs Vessel Triton (2000–2016)
  (2013–present) – replaced the Bay-class

Others
  (1987–2023) – Australian-built, gifted by the Australian Government to 12 Pacific Island countries ( appears to be the last boat in service as of November 2022)

Bahamas

Royal Bahamas Defence Force

Bahrain

Royal Bahrain Naval Force
35m Fast Patrol Vessels- USA -built by Swiftships, Commissioned in 2021

Bangladesh
The Bangladesh Navy classified its medium size patrol ships as large patrol craft (LPC) which are armed with either anti-ship missiles or torpedoes. Those ships typically have heavier armaments but less range than OPVs.

Bangladesh Navy
Large patrol craft
  
  
Offshore patrol vessel
  
 ARES 150
Inshore patrol vessel
  
  
ASW patrol boat
 Kraljevica class 
 Haizhui class    
 Hainan class 
Patrol gunboat

Bangladesh Coast Guard

Offshore patrol vessel 
Leader class 
Inshore patrol vessel 
  
  
 
  
Fast patrol vessel 
  
  
Coastal patrol vessel
 Tawfique class (former PLAN Shanghai II class) 
Riverine patrol craft

Border Guard Bangladesh
Patrol vessel
 Shah Jalal class

Barbados

Barbados Coast Guard

Belgium
 Castor  (2014–present)
 Pollux  (2015–present)

Brazil
 Grajaú-class offshore patrol vessel
 Bracuí-class patrol vessel – ex-
 Imperial Marinheiro-class offshore patrol vessel
 Piratini-class patrol vessel
 J-class patrol vessel
 Roraima-class river patrol vessel
 Pedro Teixeira-class river patrol vessel
  offshore patrol vessel

Brunei 
  offshore patrol vessel
  patrol vessel
 KH 27-class patrol boat
 FDB 512-class patrol boat
 Bendaharu-class patrol vessel
 Perwira-class patrol vessel
 Saleha-class patrol vessel
 Pahlawan-class patrol vessel

Bulgaria
 Obzor

Canada

Royal Canadian Navy
  (1996-present)
  (2006-present)
  (2016-present) – Icebreakers based on the Norwegian

Canadian Coast Guard

Cape Verde

Cape Verdean Coast Guard
 Kondor-class
 Guardiao (P511)

Chile

  (1979/1980–2001/2002)
  (1982–2014?)
  (1990–present)
  (1993–present)
  (1996–2017/2020)
  (1999–present)
  (2007–present)
  (2007–present)
  (2008–present)

China (PRC)

People's Liberation Army Navy
 Harbour security boat (PBI) – four newly built 80-ton class harbour security / patrol boats, and more are planned in order to take over the port security / patrol duties currently performed by the obsolete Shantou, Beihai, Huangpu, and Yulin-class gunboats, which are increasingly being converted to inshore surveying boats and range support boats
 Shanghai III (Type 062I)-class gunboat – 2
 Shanghai II-class gunboat
 Shanghai I (Type 062)-class gunboat – 150+ active and at least 100 in reserve
 Huludao (Type 206)-class gunboat – 8+
  – less than 25 (in reserve, subordinated to naval militia)
  – less than 30 (in reserve, subordinated to naval militia)
  – less than 15 (in reserve, subordinated to naval militia)
  – less than 40 (being transferred to logistic duties)

China Coast Guard
  (Type 718)

Colombia

Colombian Navy
 Diligente-class patrol boat
 Nodriza-class patrol boat
 PAF-I-class patrol boat
 PAF-II-class patrol boat
 PAF-III-class patrol boat
 PAF-IV-class patrol boat
 Patrullera Fluvial Ligera-class patrol boat
 Riohacha-class gunboat
 Fassmer-80 class – built in Colombia by COTECMAR

Croatia 
 Šolta (OB-02)
 Omiš (OB-31)

Denmark

Royal Danish Navy
  OPV – 2 vessels
  IPV – 6 vessels
  patrol vessel
  OPV – 4 ships (classed as ocean patrol frigates)
  IPV – 3 vessels
  IPV – 9 vessels (in Danish)
 Hvidbjørnen-class OPV (link in Danish) – 4 ships (classed as ocean patrol frigates)

Ecuador

Ecuadorian Navy
 Damen Stan Patrol 5009

Eritrea

Eritrean Navy
 Eritrea-class 60m patrol vessel

Others
 Protector-class patrol boat

Finland

Finnish Navy
  – formerly Finnish Border Guard, now Finnish Navy

Finnish Border Guard
 VL Turva – an offshore patrol vessel built at STX Finland Rauma shipyard in 2014

France

French Navy
 P400 class
 Classe La Confiance (link in French)
 
 
 Espadon 50 class (1991–2010)
 D'Entrecasteaux-class
 D'Estienne d'Orves-class

Maritime Gendarmerie
 Trident-class patrol boat
 Géranium-class patrol boat
 Jonquille-class patrol boat
 Vedette-class patrol boat
 Pétulante-class patrol craft
 Pavois-class patrol craft

Germany

 Potsdam class (2019–present)
  (2002–present)
 Helgoland class (2009–present) 
  (1943–1945)
 R boats (1929–1945)
 Type 139 patrol trawler (1956 to mid-1970s)

Greece

Hellenic Navy
 s and derivatives  and  
 s 
 Nasty-class coastal patrol vessels – formerly torpedo boats 
 Esterel-class coastal patrol vessels

Hellenic Coast Guard
  – acting as offshore patrol vessels (OPV)
 Stan Patrol 5509 OPV
 Vosper Europatrol 250 Mk1 OPV 
 Abeking & Rasmussen patrol vessels – class Dilos
 POB-24G patrol vessels – class Faiakas
 CB90-HCG
 Lambro 57 and derivatives – all being boats for coastal patrols

Honduras

Honduran Navy
 Damen Stan Patrol 4207

Hong Kong (SARPRC)

Hong Kong Police Force
 Sea Panther-class large command boat

Iceland

Icelandic Coast Guard

India

Indian Navy

Indian Coast Guard

Indonesia

 FPB 28, Indonesian Police and Indonesian Customs, 28 meter long patrol boat made by local shipyard PT PAL.
 FPB 38, Indonesian Customs, 38 meter long aluminium patrol boat made by local shipyard PT PAL.
 FPB 57, Indonesian Navy, 57 meter long patrol boat designed by Lurssen and made by PT PAL, ASM and heli deck equipped for some version.
 PC-40, Indonesian Navy, 40 meter long FRP/Aluminum patrol boat, locally made by in house Navy's workshop.
 PC-60 trimaran, Indonesian Navy, 63-meter-long composite material, is armed with 120 km range of anti-ship missile, made by PT Lundin industry
 OPV 80 - 80 meter long, designed by Terafulk and made by PT Citra Shipyard
 OPV 110 (Tanjung Datu-class) - 110 meter long, made by PT Palindo Marine Shipyard

Iraq

Iraq Navy
35m Fast Patrol Vessels- USA -built by Swiftships, during the period 2010 - 2014

Ireland
List of Irish Naval Service vessels;
  Offshore Patrol Vessels
  (1972–2001)
  (1978–2013)
  (1979–2015)
  (1980–2016)
  Helicopter Patrol Vessel
  (1984–2022)
  Coastal Patrol Vessels
  (1984–2022)
  (1985–2022)
  Offshore Patrol Vessels
  (1999–present)
  (2001–present)
  Offshore Patrol Vessels
  (2014–present)
  (2015–present)
  (2016–present)
  (2018–present)

Israel

 s 
 Dvora class fast patrol boat 
 s 
  
 s
 Shaldag Mk II 
 s (Stingray Interceptor-2000)

Italy

 Zara class, (Italian Guardia di Finanza)
 Saettia class, (Italian Coast Guard)
 Diciotti – CP 902 class, (Italian Coast Guard)
 , (Italian Coast Guard)
 , (Italian Marina Militare)
Cassiopea II class, (Italian Marina Militare)
Esploratore class, (Italian Marina Militare)
 , (Italian Marina Militare)

Jamaica

JDF Coast Guard

Japan

  (Japan Coast Guard), the largest patrol boat
  (Japan Coast Guard), large patrol vessel with helicopter deck and hangar
  (Japan Coast Guard), large patrol vessel with helicopter deck and hangar
  (Japan Coast Guard), high-speed large patrol cessel with helicopter deck
  (Kunisaki class)
 
 
  (Japan Coast Guard), high-speed large patrol vessel
  (Japan Coast Guard), medium-sized patrol vessel
  (JMSDF, Japanese Navy), corvette type patrol vessel
 ，(Japan Coast Guard), icebreaker
 Next-Generation Offshore Patrol Vessel (OPV) program (JMSDF, Japanese Navy)

Latvia
 Skrunda class, world's first SWATH patrol boat (Latvian Naval Forces)

Malaysia
 Kedah class offshore patrol vessel, (Royal Malaysian Navy)
 Keris-class littoral mission ship,(Royal Malaysian Navy)
 Gagah Class Ship, Malaysian Maritime Enforcement Agency
 Ramunia Class Ship, Malaysian Maritime Enforcement Agency
 Nusa Class Ship, Malaysian Maritime Enforcement Agency
 Sipadan Class Ship, Malaysian Maritime Enforcement Agency
 Rhu Class Ship, Malaysian Maritime Enforcement Agency
 Pengawal Class Ship, Malaysian Maritime Enforcement Agency
 Peninjau Class Ship, Malaysian Maritime Enforcement Agency
 Pelindung Class Ship, Malaysian Maritime Enforcement Agency
 Semilang Class Ship, Malaysian Maritime Enforcement Agency
 Penggalang Class Ship, Malaysian Maritime Enforcement Agency
 Penyelamat Class Ship, Malaysian Maritime Enforcement Agency
 Pengaman Class Ship, Malaysian Maritime Enforcement Agency
 Kilat Class Ship, Malaysian Maritime Enforcement Agency
 Malawali Class Ship, Malaysian Maritime Enforcement Agency
 Langkawi Class Patrol Ship, Malaysian Maritime Enforcement Agency

Malta

 Protector class offshore patrol vessel (Maritime Squadron of the Armed Forces of Malta) – 2002–present
 Diciotti class offshore patrol vessel (Maritime Squadron of the Armed Forces of Malta) – 2005–present
 P21 class inshore patrol vessel (Maritime Squadron of the Armed Forces of Malta) – 2010–present
 Emer class offshore patrol vessel (Maritime Squadron of the Armed Forces of Malta) – 2015–present

Mexico

Mexican Navy
Coastal patrol boat

Offshore patrol vessel

Montenegro 

 Kotor class frigate

Morocco

OPV-70 class, offshore patrol vessel (Royal Moroccan Navy)
OPV-64 class, offshore patrol vessel (Royal Moroccan Navy)

Namibia
 Grajaú-class offshore patrol vessel

Netherlands

Royal Netherlands Navy

 Holland class offshore patrol vessels

Netherlands Coastguard
 Visarend
 Zeearend
 Barend Biesheuvel

Dutch Caribbean Coast Guard
 Damen Stan Patrol 4100

New Zealand
 Protector OPV (Royal New Zealand Navy) (2008)
 Lake-class inshore patrol vessel (Royal New Zealand Navy) (2008)
  (Royal New Zealand Navy)(1983–2008)

Nicaragua

Nicaraguan Navy

Norway

Royal Norwegian Navy
 Rapp-class
 Tjeld-class
 Storm-class
 Snøgg-class
 Hauk-class
 Skjold-class

Norwegian Coast Guard

 Barentshav class OPV 
 Harstad class OPV
 Nordkapp class OPV
 Nornen class
 Svalbard class icebreaker
 Jan Mayen-class - Planned replacement for the Nordkapp-class

Peru
 Río Zarumilla class, Peruvian Coast Guard
 Rio Cañete class, Peruvian Coast Guard

Philippines

Philippine Navy
 Alberto Navarette-class
 Jose Andrada class
 Nestor Acero-class
 Malvar-class patrol vessel
 Jacinto-class patrol vessel
 stretched HDP-1500neo offshore patrol vessel
 Gregorio del Pilar-class offshore patrol vessel

Philippine Coast Guard
 Boracay-class patrol boat
 Ilocos Norte-class patrol boat
 Parola-class patrol vessel
 San Juan-class patrol vessel
 Gabriela Silang-class offshore patrol vessel
 Teresa Magbanua-class patrol vessel, offshore

Portugal

Portuguese Navy
Viana do Castelo class
Tejo-class 
Centauro-class
Argos-class
Rio Minho-class
Cacine-class

Maritime Police 

 Bolina-class
 Levante-class
 Tufão-class
 Calmaria-class

National Republican Guard
 Bojador-class
 Ribamar-class
 Zodíaco-class
 Mar Creta-class

Qatar

Qatari Emiri Navy 
 Musherib class

Qatari Ministry of Interior 
 ARES 75
 ARES 110
 ARES 150

Romania
 SNR-17 class patrol boats, Romanian Border Police
 Stefan Cel Mare patrol vessel, Romanian Border Police

Russia

 Stenka class patrol boat (Project 02059), Russian Navy and Russian Coast Guard
 Bogomol Class patrol boat (Project 02065), Russian Navy
 Mirage class patrol vessel (Project 14310), Russian Coast Guard
 Svetlyak class patrol boat (Project 10410)， Russian Coast Guard
 Ogonek class patrol boat (Project 12130), Russian Coast Guard
 Mangust class patrol boat (Project 12150, Russian Coast Guard
 Sobol class patrol boat (Project 12200）, Russian Coast Guard
 Terrier class patrol boat (Project 14170), Russian Navy and Russian Coast Guard
 Rubin class patrol boat (Project 22460), Russian Coast Guard
 Okean class patrol vessel (Project 22100), Russian Coast Guard
 Vosh class river patrol craft (Project 12481), Russian Coast Guard
 Piyavka class river patrol craft (Project 1249), Russian Coast Guard
 Ogonek class river patrol craft (Project 12130), Russian Coast Guard

Senegal

 Fouladou (OPV 190), Senegalese Navy
 Kedougou (OPV 45), Senegalese Navy
 Ferlo (RPB 33), Senegalese Navy
 Conejera (Class Conejera P 31), Senegalese Navy
 Fouta (Osprey 55), Senegalese Navy
 Njambuur (PR 72), Senegalese Navy

Singapore

 , Republic of Singapore Navy
 PK class Interceptor Craft, Police Coast Guard
 1st Generation PT class patrol Craft, Police Coast Guard (decommissioned)
 2nd Generation PT class patrol Craft, Police Coast Guard (decommissioned)
 3rd Generation PT class patrol Craft, Police Coast Guard
 4th Generation PT class patrol  Craft, Police Coast Guard
 PC class patrol Craft, Police Coast Guard
 
 ,  Republic of Singapore Navy

Slovenia
 Slovenian patrol boat Triglav

South Africa

 Warrior class (modified Saar 4 Open Sea Patrol Vessels)
 Namacurra class

South Korea (ROK)
 Chamsuri-class (Republic of Korea Navy)
 Yoon Youngha-class patrol vessel

Spain

 Meteoro class
 Descubierta class 
 Serviola class 
 Anaga class
 Barceló class
 Toralla class
 Conejera class
 Chilreu class
 P111 class patrol boat
 Cabo Fradera class

Sri Lanka

 Jayasagara  class (Sri Lanka Navy)
 Colombo class (Sri Lanka Navy)

Suriname 
 Ocea Type FPB 98 class fast patrol boat
 Ocea Type FPB 72 class fast patrol boat

Sweden 

 Hugin-class (based on the Norwegian Storm-class, decommissioned) – 16 ships
 Kaparen-class (Hugin-class modified with better subhunting capacity, decommissioned) – 8 ships
 Stockholm-class (commissioned as corvettes, later converted to patrol boats) – 2 ships
 HMS Carlskrona (commissioned as minelayer, later converted to ocean patrol vessel)

Additionally, the Royal Swedish Navy also operates smaller types of patrol boats (Swedish: bevakningsbåt = "guard boat"):
 Typ 60-class (decommissioned) – 17 ships
 Tapper class – 12 ships

The Swedish Coast Guard operate an additional 22 patrol vessels for maritime surveillance.

Thailand
 Pattani class (Royal Thai Navy)
 River class (Royal Thai Navy)
 T.991 class (Royal Thai Navy)
 krabi class (Royal Thai Navy)

Trinidad and Tobago

Trinidad and Tobago Coast Guard
 Damen Stan Patrol 5009

Turkey

Turkish Naval Forces
 Kılıç II class
 Kılıç I class
 Yıldız class
 Rüzgar class
 Doğan class
 Kartal class
 Türk class
 Tuzla class

Coast Guard Command
 KAAN 15 class
 KAAN 19 class
 KAAN 29 class
 KAAN 33 class
 SAR 33 class
 SAR 35 class
 80 class
 Corvette

United Kingdom

 Kingfisher-class patrol vessel of 1935 
 Motor Launch of World War II
 Harbour Defence Motor Launch of World War II
 River class patrol vessel
 Castle class patrol vessel
 Archer class patrol vessel
 Island class patrol vessel
 Scimitar class patrol vessel
 UKBF 42m Customs Cutter
 Cutlass class patrol vessel - planned service entry with the Gibraltar Squadron from 2022

United States

United States Navy

  - (1993–present) 
 Mark VI patrol boat- US Navy (2016–present)

United States Coast Guard
 
  - (2000-2011) - four boats were transferred to the Coast Guard for a temporary loan, three (2004-2011) have since been returned, while the fourth (2000-2004) was donated to the Philippine Navy
  – (1998–present)
  – (1985–present)
  – (2012–present)

Venezuela

  (GC-23)

Vietnam
 Type TT-120 patrol boat, Vietnam Coast Guard
 Type TT-200 patrol boat, Vietnam Coast Guard
 Type TT-400 patrol boat, Vietnam Coast Guard
 DN 2000(Damen 9014 class) offshore patrol vessels, Vietnam Coast Guard

References

Patrol vessels
Ship types